Cypress Creek station is a Tri-Rail commuter rail station in Fort Lauderdale, Florida. The station is located on North Andrews Way, west of North Andrews Avenue (SR 811) and I-95, and south of West Cypress Creek Road.

Originally opened to service June 12, 1989, the station features a park and ride lot along West Cypress Creek Road between North Andrews Avenue and I-95. Another parking lot is located across the tracks at a cul-de-sac named Northwest 59th Court.

History

The station was originally scheduled to open on January 9, 1989, with the rest of the Tri-Rail system, but construction delays pushed its opening back a few months. Cypress Creek station opened on June 12, 1989.

Station layout
The station has two side platforms, with parking and buses west of the southbound platform.

References

External links
South Florida Regional Transportation Authority - Cypress Creek station

Tri-Rail stations in Broward County, Florida
Railway stations in the United States opened in 1989
1989 establishments in Florida